The Ascensor Artillería is one of the 16 funicular railways located in the Chilean city of Valparaíso. It links the "plan" (flat area) of the city with the Artillería hill, and is privately owned. The line runs all year.

History

This was the third funicular railway built in the city of Valparaíso. It was inaugurated on 29 December 1892, but didn't enter service until 22 of January 1893, due to a lack of water to run the machinery.

It was so successful that its designer Ernesto Onfray built another adjacent to it in 1908, making it the only funicular in the city with four tracks and two independent machine rooms.

In 1968 the first line of the funicular ceased operation due to low ridership.

Today the funicular uses the second line, and is a major landmark.

Specifications
 Two cars have traditional funicular design, with a capacity of 25 passengers
 Drive equipment located at the top station
 The trip takes 80 seconds
  track
 Hoisting ropes attached to upper ends of car chassis
 Fares are paid at the top station

See also

Funicular railway
Funicular railways of Valparaíso
List of funicular railways
Valparaíso

Valparaíso
Funicular railways in Chile
Transport in Valparaíso Region